Blueprint is the sixth studio album by Dutch trance artist Ferry Corsten, released on 26 May 2017 though Flashover Recordings. It is a science fiction-influenced trance album with tracks containing a storyline narrated by American actor Campbell Scott. The plot narrative, which is unfolded at the beginning of each song, depicts humans on Earth who begin to hear an endlessly repeating sound emitted from space and the creation of an android by a man who had deciphered the sound's hidden message.

The album features a single from Corsten's side project "Gouryella" titled "Venera (Vee's Theme)", which was the first single released to promote the album. Along with "Venera (Vee's Theme)", four other singles were released with the album, "Reanimate", "Trust", "Waiting", and "Wherever You Are". Blueprint received positive reception from music critics, who praised the album's overall sound design and emotional listening experience evoked by each track.

Background

Unlike Ferry Corsten's earlier albums, Blueprint is a concept album whose concept is based on a science fiction-themed love story. According to Ferry, the initial inspiration for creating a narrative-focused album came from his father reminding him of Jeff Wayne's Musical Version of The War of the Worlds, an album that they used to listen together. Like the main concept of Blueprint, it is a progressive rock and symphonic rock album which contains narratives from Welsh actor Richard Burton. "As a kid, I grew up looking at the vinyls with all the artwork and paintings of these aliens and stuff. I was fascinated by it!" When Ferry's father reminded him of the old album, a lightbulb went off: "You just said the magic words, I told him. You just gave me an idea," recounted Ferry.

Being a science fiction fan since his younger days, Ferry decided to base the theme of Blueprint on that very concept. "Ever since I was a little kid, I’ve been a big sci-fi fan. The interest in the unknown and what lies beyond that always grabbed me. For this project I had a chance to work with both my favourite interests, sci-fi and music," said Ferry. The storyline was written by Hollywood screenwriter David Harrington Miller, who was introduced to Ferry by his manager. "We hit it off very well and working together was easy and fun. The flow was fantastic," said Ferry. Blueprint contains illustrations from Canadian visual artist Oska, and is narrated by actor Campbell Scott.

Critical reception
Blueprint was met with generally positive reviews upon release. Dancing Astronaut’s Kanvar Kohli complimented the usage of voice-overs for most of the tracks and highlighted the strength of the album's science-fiction theme. He also praised Corsten for capturing the album's other-worldly sound design. Shivani Murthy from The Music Essentials states that the album, "has been impeccably conceptualized and executed with absolute perfection", giving listeners an ‘‘out of the world’’ experience. Shawn Russel Johnson from HuffPost described Blueprint as a "display of the artist's mastery of the trance genre", capable of manipulating the emotions of listeners with every track.

Track listing

Disc one

Disc two

Personnel
Credits adapted from Discogs and AllMusic

Technical and composing credits 
Ferry Corsten – primary artist, composer, producer
 Claire Wilkinson - featured artist
 Tony Verdult - producer (vocals)
 Niels Geusebroek - featured artist, writer, composer
 Matthew Steeper - producer (vocals), writer, composer
 Pete Nappi - producer (vocals)
 Yk Koi - writer, composer
 Kelly Sweet -  featured artist, writer, composer
 Eric Lumiere - featured artist, writer, composer
 Han Kooreneef - writer, composer
 Martijn Spierenburg - writer, composer
 Menno Reyntjes - writer, composer
 David Sneddon - writer, composer
 Kimberly Anne Sutherland - writer, composer
 Joe Killington - writer, composer
 Laura Brehm - writer, composer
 Karra Madden - writer, composer
 Renske Taminiau - writer, composer
 Vincent van Reeken - writer, composer
 Stijn Versteeg - writer, composer

Artwork credits
Oska - artist

Story credits
Campbell Scott - narrator
 David Harrington Miller - writer (story)

Charts

Release history

See also 
 Ferry Corsten discography

References 

2017 albums
Ferry Corsten albums